This article is about the spiritual beliefs, histories and practices in Kwakwaka'wakw mythology. The Kwakwaka'wakw are a group of Indigenous nations, numbering about 5,500, who live in the central coast of British Columbia on northern Vancouver Island and the mainland. Kwakwaka'wakw translates into "Kwak'wala-speaking tribes." However, the tribes are single autonomous nations and do not view themselves collectively as one group.

These people share many common cultural customs with neighboring nations. They share beliefs in many of the same spirits and deities, although speak different languages. Some spirits are, however, totally unique to one or two cultures and are not universally known throughout the Northwest Coast. Each tribe has its own history, practices, and stories. Some origin stories belong to only one specific tribe, while another tribe has its own stories. But many practices, rituals, and ceremonies occur throughout Kwakwaka'wakw culture, and in some cases, neighboring indigenous cultures also.

Creation stories 
The Kwakwaka'wakw creation narrative states the world was created by a raven flying over water, who, finding nowhere to land, decided to create islands by dropping small pebbles into the water. He then created trees and grass, and, after several failed attempts, he made the first man and woman out of wood and clay.

Flood 
Main page: Deluge (mythology)
Like all Indigenous peoples of the Pacific Northwest Coast, most of the Kwakwaka'wakw tribes have stories about their people surviving the flood. With some of these nations, their history talks of their  ancestors transforming into their natural form and disappearing while the waters rose then subsided. For others, they have stories of their people attaching their oceangoing canoes to tall peaking mountains. For the stories about supernatural powers, these figures tend to be the founding clans of some Kwakwaka'wakw nations.

Ancestors, crest, and clans 
Tseiqami is a man who comes from the cedar tree and Thunderbird, lord of the winter dance season, a massive supernatural bird whose wing beats cause the thunder, and the flash of whose eyes causes lightning. Tseiqami hunts whales for its dinner out at sea, and sometimes helped heroic ancestors build houses by placing giant cedar beams for them. Thunderbird has a younger brother named Kolus.

Thunderbird's adversary is Qaniqilak, spirit of the summer season, who is often identified as the sea god, Kumugwe. Kumugwe or Komokwa is the name of "Undersea Chief." Many Kwakwaka'wakw families have been blessed by riches and supernatural treasures bestowed by this god of the tides and maker of coppers. 

Sisiutl is a giant three-headed sea serpent whose glance can turn an adversary into stone. Cross beams of clan houses sometimes are carved with his appearance. Blessed ancestors have sometimes received sisiutl's help when he transforms himself into an invincible war canoe, and sometimes into a magic belt with which to gird oneself against all dangers.

Dzunukwa (Tsonokwa) is a type of cannibal giant (called sasquatch by other Northwest Coast tribes) and comes in both male and female forms. In most legends, the female form is the most commonly told; she eats children and cries "hu-hu!" to attract them, she imitates the child's grandmother's voice. Children frequently outwit her, sometimes killing her and taking her treasures without being eaten.

Bakwas is king of the ghosts. He is a small green spirit whose face looks emaciated like a skeleton, but has a long curving nose. He haunts the forests and tries to bring the living over to the world of the dead. In some myths Bakwas is the husband of Dzunukwa.

U'melth is the Raven, who brought the Kwakwaka'wakw people the moon, fire, salmon, the sun and the tides.

Pugwis is a sort of aquatic creature with a fish-like face and large incisors.

Ceremony 
Kwakwaka'wakw spirituality is transmitted at ceremonies, mostly during the winter season. These ceremonies are often referred to as potlatches. They are mostly designed for the transference, justification, and reaffirmation of family and spiritual status inherited from primeval ancestors who contacted the spirit world and were given privileges from beings of a supernatural nature. These beings prefer honor, power, and magic through the gift of Tlugwe, which are supernatural treasures, often taking the physical form of masks and regalia, but also comprising stories, songs, recitations, dances, and other intangible performances.

Kwakwaka'wakw spirits, like those of other Northwest Coast peoples, can be divided into four separate spirit realms: sky spirits, sea spirits, earth spirits, and otherworldly spirits. All four realms interact with one another, and human beings attempt to contact all four worlds and often channel their spirits at sacred ceremonies wherein dancers go into trances while wearing masks and other regalia associated with the spiritworld.

Of particular importance in Kwakwaka'wakw culture is the secret society called Hamatsa. During the winter, there is a four-day complex dance that serves to initiate new members of Hamatsa. The Hamatsa dancer represents the spirit of Baxbaxwalanuksiwe ("Man-Eater at the North End of the World"); who can transform into various man-eating birds and has mouths all over his body. Hamatsa initiates are possessed by Baxwbakwalanuksiwe'. On the first day of the Hamatsa ceremonies the initiate is lured out of the woods and brought into the Big House to be tamed. When the initiate returns, he enacts his cannibalistic possession symbolically. Gwaxwgwakwalanuksiwe' is the most prestigious role in the Supernatural Man-Eater Birds ceremony; he is a man-eating raven. Galuxwadzuwus ("Crooked-Beak of Heaven") and Huxhukw (supernatural Crane-Like Bird who cracks skulls of men to suck out their brains) are other participants.

See also 
 Kwak'wala
 Sisiutl
 Winalagalis
 Dantsikw

Notes

References

 Kwakiutl Art by Audrey Hawthorn
 
 Hamatsa: The Enigma of Cannibalism on the Pacific Northwest Coast by Jim McDowell
 Chiefly Feasts: The Enduring Kwakiutl Potlatch by Aldona Jonaitis
 
 The Kwakiutl Indians of British Columbia by Ronald Rohner and Evelyn Bettauer
 The mouth of heaven: An introduction to Kwakiutl religious thought by Irving Goldman
 

 
First Nations culture